Naughty Ones is a platform game for the Amiga and Amiga CD32. It was released by Interactivision in early 1994. It was programmed by Jacob Gorm Hansen (Paleface) and the graphics were done by Henrik Mikkelsen (Seen), both from the demo group Melon Dezign.

External links
Naughty Ones at Lemon Amiga
Naughty Ones at Amiga Hall of Light

1994 video games
Amiga games
Amiga CD32 games
Demoscene software
Video games developed in Denmark